Ehrengard is a 1982 Italian drama film directed by Emidio Greco. It is based on the novel with the same name written by Karen Blixen. It premiered at the 1982 Venice International Film Festival. However, due to the bankruptcy of the producers, it was not released theatrically until 2002.

Cast 
 Jean Pierre Cassel: Cazotte
 Audrey Matson: Ehrengard
 Lea Padovani: Granduchessa 
 Christian Borromeo: Lotario
 Alessandro Haber: Matthias
 Caterina Boratto: Countess von Gassner

See also        
 List of Italian films of 1982

References

External links

1982 films
Italian drama films
Films based on Danish novels
Films based on works by Karen Blixen
Films directed by Emidio Greco
1980s Italian films